Pinus halepensis, commonly known as the Aleppo pine, also known as the Jerusalem pine, is a pine native to the Mediterranean region.

Description
The bark is orange-red, thick, and deeply fissured at the base of the trunk, and thin and flaky in the upper crown. They open slowly over the next few years, a process quickened if they are exposed to heat such as in forest fires.

Related species 
The Aleppo pine is closely related to the Turkish pine, Canary Island pine, and maritime pine, which all share many of its characteristics. Some authors include the Turkish pine as a subspecies of the Aleppo pine, as Pinus halepensis subsp. brutia (Ten.) Holmboe, but it is usually regarded as a distinct species. It is a relatively nonvariable species, in that its morphological characteristics stay constant over the entire range.

Distribution and habitat
The native range of Pinus halepensis extends from Morocco, Algeria, Tunisia, and Spain north to southern France, Malta, Italy, Croatia,  Montenegro, and Albania, and east to Greece. It has been introduced into many parts of the world, including Portugal. There is an outlying population (from which it was first described) in Syria, Lebanon, southern Turkey, Jordan, Israel and Palestine.

The tree is able to quickly colonize open and disturbed areas. It is classed as an invasive species in South Africa. It can grow on all substrates and almost in all bioclimates in the Mediterranean.

Pinus halepensis is a diagnostic species of the vegetation class Pinetea halepensis.

Uses
The resin of the Aleppo pine is used to flavor the Greek wine retsina.

From the pine nuts of the Aleppo pine is made a pudding called asidet zgougou in the Tunisian dialect; it is served in bowls, covered with cream, and topped with almonds and small candies.

The Maltese dessert prinjolata is also prepared using these pine nuts, both in its filling as well as a topping.

Aleppo pine are used for bonsai.

Forestry
In its native area, P. halepensis is widely planted for its fine timber, making it one of the most important forestry trees in Algeria and Morocco.

In Israel, natural patches of Aleppo pine forests can be found in the Carmel and Galilee regions. The Aleppo pine, along with Pinus brutia, has been planted extensively by the Jewish National Fund. It proved very successful in Yatir Forest in the northern Negev (on the edge of the desert), where foresters had not expected it to survive. Many Aleppo pine forests exist today in Israel and are used for recreational purposes. Although it is a local species, some argue that the historical replacement of natural oak maquis shrubland and garrigue with tall stands of pine has created "ecological deserts" and has significantly changed the species assemblage of these regions. The species produces timber which is valued for its hardness, density and unproblematic seasoning. Seasoned timber is inclined to tear out with planing, but this can be avoided by using sharp blades or adjusting the sharpening angle of tools.

The Aleppo pine is considered an invasive species though useful in South Africa; in South Australia, a control program is in place on Eyre Peninsula.

Landscape
Pinus halepensis is a popular ornamental tree, extensively planted in gardens, parks, and private and agency landscapes in hot dry areas such as Southern California and the Karoo in South Africa, where the Aleppo pine's considerable heat and drought tolerance, fast growth, and aesthetic qualities are highly valued.

In culture
Paul Cézanne had an Aleppo pine in his garden at Aix-en-Provence; this tree was the inspiration and model for his painting The Big Trees. As of 2005, the tree is still growing in Cézanne's garden.

References

External links

 Gymnosperm Database: Pinus halepensis
 Pinus halepensis—distribution map, genetic conservation units and related resources. European Forest Genetic Resources Programme (EUFORGEN)

Drought-tolerant trees
Flora of Lebanon and Syria
Flora of Palestine (region)
Garden plants of Africa
Garden plants of Asia
Least concern plants
Ornamental trees
Plants described in 1768
halepensis
Trees of Europe
Trees of Mediterranean climate
Trees of Morocco
Taxa named by Philip Miller
Flora of Malta
Flora of the Mediterranean Basin